Pedro Milans Carámbula (born 24 March 2002) is a Uruguayan professional footballer who plays as a right-back for Peñarol.

Club career
Milans made his professional debut on 6 December 2019 in a 3–0 league defeat against Nacional. He started the match and played 75 minutes before getting replaced by Eric Barrios.

On 18 July 2022, Milans joined Peñarol on a contract until December 2023.

International career
Milans is a former Uruguayan youth international. He was part of national team squad which played at the 2017 South American U-15 Championship and 2019 South American U-17 Championship.

References

External links
 

2002 births
Living people
Association football defenders
Uruguayan footballers
Uruguay youth international footballers
Uruguayan Primera División players
Uruguayan Segunda División players
Juventud de Las Piedras players
Peñarol players